Fairy Lake is a lake in Gallatin County, Montana at the base of Sacagawea Peak, a part of the Bridger mountains in south central Montana.

References

External links
 Montana Fish, Wildlife, and Parks page on Fairy Lake

Bodies of water of Gallatin County, Montana
Lakes of Montana
Gallatin National Forest
Protected areas of Gallatin County, Montana